The 2020 Arnold Palmer Cup was a team golf competition held from December 21–23, 2020 at  Bay Hill Club and Lodge, Bay Hill, Florida. It was the 24th time the event had been contested and the third under the new format in which women golfers played in addition to men and an international team, representing the rest of the world, replaced the European team. The international team won the match 40½–19½.

The event was originally planned to be played at Lahinch Golf Club, Lahinch, Ireland from July 3–5 but was moved because of the COVID-19 pandemic.

Format
The contest was played over three days. On Monday, there were 12 mixed four-ball matches. On Tuesday there were 12 mixed foursomes matches in the morning and 12 fourball matches in the afternoon, six all-women matches and six all-men matches. 24 singles matches were played on Wednesday. In all, 60 matches were played.

Each of the 60 matches was worth one point in the larger team competition. If a match was all square after the 18th hole, each side earned half a point toward their team total. The team that accumulated at least 30½ points won the competition.

Teams
The teams were announced in March 2020, before the postponement of the event. A number of players were unable to compete and were replaced. Four replacements were announced on December 4, 2020 and another on December 15. For the United States, Kaitlin Milligan and Andy Ogletree were in the original teams, while Vivian Hou, Aline Krauter and Hazel MacGarvie were in the International team announced in March 2020. Ogletree had turned professional before the event.

William Mouw (Pepperdine), a member of the American team, was a late withdrawal and was not replaced. On the first day his partner, Megan Schofill, played the fourball match alone. In the other three sessions, matches involving him were deemed to be tied.

The head coaches were announced in August 2019 with the assistant coaches selected in September 2019.

Monday's mixed fourball matches

Tuesday's matches

Morning mixed foursomes matches

Afternoon fourball matches

Wednesday's singles matches

Michael Carter award
The Michael Carter Award winners were John Pak and Puwit Anupansuebsai.

References

External links
Arnold Palmer Cup official site

Arnold Palmer Cup
Golf in Florida
Arnold Palmer Cup
Arnold Palmer Cup
Arnold Palmer Cup
Arnold Palmer Cup
Golf events postponed due to the COVID-19 pandemic